Vlastimil Daníček (born 15 July 1991) is a Czech football player who currently plays for Slovácko. He has represented the Czech Republic at youth level.

References

External links
 
 

1991 births
Living people
Czech footballers
Czech Republic youth international footballers
Czech Republic under-21 international footballers
Czech First League players
1. FC Slovácko players
Association football defenders